Cheryl Saban (born April 30, 1951) is an American psychologist, author, television writer, and philanthropist. She is a former Senior Advisor to the United States Mission to the United Nations. She is the author of several children's books, a novel, self-help books, numerous gift books, and many teleplays.

Early life and education
Cheryl Saban was born as Cheryl Lyn Flor on April 30, 1951, in San Diego, California. Her father worked for the local telephone company. Saban worked as a telephone solicitor, waitressed at a barbecue-pit restaurant, and worked summers as a lifeguard at a Navy training center.

Saban attended San Diego State University. In 2005 she earned a doctorate in psychology from California Coast University.

Career
Saban started her career as a model in San Francisco, California in 1973 and Los Angeles in 1975. She recorded her first album in 1978 under the name Flower. In April 1979, Playboy included her in a nude pictorial titled “Disco Queens".

Saban accepted a job as an assistant for Israeli-American Haim Saban, a millionaire who later became her husband, in 1986. She wrote for television multiple times, including 19 episodes of Mighty Morphin Power Rangers, produced by Saban. She is the author of four children's books, a thriller, and several self-help books.

Saban was nominated as Senior Advisor to the United States Mission to the United Nations by President Barack Obama in September 2012.

Philanthropy
Saban is the president of Saban Family Foundation. She and her husband both donate through the foundation, which typically focuses on children, education and women's health. Through a $10 million donation, Saban established the Cheryl Saban Self-Worth Foundation for Women & Girls in 2009. The foundation will provide micro-financing programs to women in the U.S. and in Israel.

Saban is on the board of directors of the Clinton Foundation. She received an honorary doctorate from the Ben-Gurion University of the Negev in Israel in 2014. As of May 2018, they are supporting the building of a museum in Los Angeles.

Los Angeles Free Clinic
In 1968, Los Angeles Free Clinic opened at 115 North Fairfax Avenue, Los Angeles.
The Los Angeles Free Clinic is the longest continually running free clinic in the nation.

In her years of financial difficulty, Cheryl Saban was a patient of the Los Angeles Free Clinic. Later, with her husband, they donated $10 million, and in 2008, it was renamed the Saban Free Clinic. now Saban Community Clinic of Beverly Hills, Rampart Village, Hollywood, Melrose, and Blessed Sacrament.

Personal life
Saban has been married three times. She married her first husband, Ray Lenhart, at the age of 20. They had two daughters, Tifanie Lenhart Chaney and actress Heidi Lenhart Stills, and divorced soon after. She later married and divorced Bobby Ocean. He was a music producer, and struggled to provide for her children.

Saban married her third husband, Egyptian-born Israeli-American billionaire Haim Saban in 1987. They had two children through a surrogate (Saban had previously had a hysterectomy): son Ness (Hebrew for Miracle) and daughter Tanya. Ness was the eighth surrogate-born baby in the world and Tanya was the fortieth. Although Cheryl is a Lutheran, she agreed to raise the children Jewish. The family always puts up a Christmas tree and celebrates Shabbat weekly. Saban told the rabbi who married them: "Think of me as a Christian who believes in Judaism.” They reside in Beverly Hills, California.

Bibliography

Screenwriting credits

Television
 Mighty Morphin Power Rangers (1993-1995)
 VR Troopers (1994)
 Sweet Valley High (1995)
 Little Mouse on the Prairie (1996)

Film
 Au Pair (1999)
 Au Pair II (2001)

References

1951 births
American children's writers
American Lutherans
American non-fiction writers
American self-help writers
American thriller writers
California Coast University alumni
California Democrats
Clinton Foundation people
Living people
People from Beverly Hills, California
People from San Diego
San Diego State University alumni
Philanthropists from California
1970s Playboy Playmates
American women children's writers
Women thriller writers
Novelists from California
American women non-fiction writers
21st-century American women